The All These Poses Anniversary Tour (also known as the All These Poses Tour) is the ninth headlining concert tour by Canadian-American recording artist, Rufus Wainwright. The tour is a celebration of his career, marking its 20th anniversary in May 2018. Wainwright played nearly 50 concerts in North America, Australasia, Asia and Europe.

Background
Wainwright announced the tour in April 2018, on this official Facebook page. The singer was still in the middle of his 2018 regional tours. The tour celebrates Wainwright's career, coinciding with the release of his eponymous debut studio album. Despite the tour commemorating his first album, Wainwright stated he would perform from songs from this first two albums. The singer further explained the name "All These Poses" was far better than the "Rufus Wainwright Tour"; stating the "poses" were the many elements of the maturing of his career and personal life. All songs stuck to their original production but presenting in a charming manner. With this, he able to explore dichotomy of each song. The concert also features select new material, with the second half of the show, the entire Poses album is performed.

During an interview with Scenestr, Wainwright stated this tour was a ramp-up to his forthcoming eighth studio album, his first since 2012. Speaking of the tour, the singer said:"Funny how one totally changes and totally doesn’t at the same time. Looking forward to singing the longing melodies of a boy with the voice of a grown man, and share it with you all on my #ALLTHESEPOSEStour. I’ll be traveling with my band, performing material from both my Rufus Wainwright & Poses albums."

Critical reception
The tour received high praise from critics. Adam Grim of The Cavalier Daily said of the concert in Charlottesville: "Never as famous as his talent merited, Wainwright has matured into a compelling mid-career artist, delving into opera composition and, with 'Sword of Damocles', mastering operatic pop. At the Paramount, Wainwright showcased the triumphs of his prodigious early albums while offering a paradigm for how prodigy matures."

Olivia de Zilva from the Adelaide Review said of the concert in Adelaide: "Ending the set with a cover of The Beatles' 'Across the Universe' (a song which launched him into international prominence courtesy of the I Am Sam (2001) soundtrack), Wainwright modestly bows under a spotlight in a simple red jacket better. At 45, Wainwright seems proud of his accomplishments; looking up into the crowd and smiling humbly, he thanks everyone for supporting him for over 20-years." In Auckland, Gwilym Breese (Radio13) stated the concert was "an experience worth remembering". He further stated: "Somewhere between balladeer and Broadway, the baroque-pop star Rufus Wainwright really showed why he has managed to keep putting out fantastic music for the last twenty years and hopefully, he will do so for another twenty."

For the concert in London, Jazz Monroe (The Guardian) have the shows four-out-of-five stars. She says: "[...]But he is an incorrigible crowd-pleaser, and clearly sees each performance as its own artwork. To open tonight’s show, he strolls on in a pinstripe suit with ankle swingers and a top hat, like an Edwardian circus master."

The shows in Manchester and Glasgow also received four-out-of-five stars. Joe Goggins (Manchester Evening News) wrote: "Still, Rufus Wainwright does precisely nothing in anybody’s image but his own and tonight holds fast to that. When he closes the encore - wearing a lurid bomber jacket not dissimilar to the leather one that Poses describes - he’s doing so in celebratory fashion, with an arms-in-the-air, here’s-to-the-next-twenty sense about him. He never sits still for long, so reflections like tonight should, in the grand scheme of things, be considered welcome rarities." Bill Bain (The Herald) wrote: "All these theatrical poses still work for Rufus, of course. Yet if this tour truly was a funeral for the past, perhaps he’s finally realized if you stay the same too long you turn to stone - becoming nothing but a statue of your former self."

In Ottawa, Daniel Sylvester of Exclaim! said: "Rufus ended the nearly two-and-a-half hour show with his cover of the Beatles' "Across the Universe" before promising that he'll be back next time with "new songs" — clearly showing an exhausted-looking Rufus more than ready to move on from the first 20 years of his career."

Opening act
Rachel Eckroth

Setlist
The following setlist was obtained from the concert held on December 4, 2018, at the Beacon Theatre in New York City, New York. It does not represent every concert for the duration of the tour. 
"April Fools"
"Barcelona"
"Danny Boy"
"Foolish Love"
"Sally Ann"
"In My Arms"
"Millbrook"
"Beauty Mark"
"Both Sides, Now"
"Sword of Damocles"
Intermission
"Cigarettes and Chocolate Milk"
"Greek Song"
"Poses"
"Shadows"
"California"
"The Tower of Learning"
"Grey Gardens"
"Rebel Prince"
"The Consort"
"One Man Guy" 
"Evil Angel"
"In a Graveyard"
Encore
"Imaginary Love"
"Going to a Town"
"Across the Universe"

Tour dates

Festivals and other miscellaneous performances
This convert was a part of "Zoo Twilights"
This concert was a part of the "Gijón Sound Festival"

Box office score data

References

2018 concert tours
2019 concert tours
Rufus Wainwright